Lennart Fagerlund (born 2 April 1952) is a Swedish former cyclist. He competed in the individual road race and team time trial events at the 1972 Summer Olympics. His sporting career began with Mariestadcyclisten.

References

External links
 

1952 births
Living people
Swedish male cyclists
Olympic cyclists of Sweden
Cyclists at the 1972 Summer Olympics
People from Nässjö Municipality
UCI Road World Champions (elite men)
Sportspeople from Jönköping County
20th-century Swedish people
21st-century Swedish people